Rishworth School is a co-educational independent school in the village of Rishworth, near Halifax, in West Yorkshire, England. With Heathfield, its junior school from the ages of 3 to 11, it provides education for pupils aged between 3 and 18 years, with boarding from the age of 11.

History
The school was founded and endowed by John Wheelwright in 1724 and established in a building which is now the school chapel. When the Wheelwright Building was built in 1826 the old building was converted into a chapel for the people of Rishworth, until St John's Church, Rishworth opened at the end of the 19th century. Other school buildings near the Wheelwright building were built in 1930, 1933 and 1950.

More recently, in 1963, a new Music and Drama building was opened, and by 1984, a new teaching block was opened, consisting of four science laboratories, a large assembly hall, and numerous other classrooms hosting Mathematics, English and Modern Languages. An extension to the teaching block was completed in 1988 which saw the addition of a two-storey Design and Technology department, along with workshops.

The school is a founder member of the Society of Headmasters & Headmistresses of Independent Schools, established in 1961 through the then Headmasters' Conference.

Inspection
Rishworth School was most recently inspected by the Independent Schools' Inspectorate in November 2017. The school received the highest grading of excellent in all categories and more specifically with reference to pupils' academic and personal development.

Boarding

There are five boarding houses with total housing for 150. Each house has study bedrooms, TVs and computers, and provides disabled facilities. Routine in the houses is structured, with fixed times for meals, homework and free time. Bedrooms typically hold two to four boarders, but senior students, especially sixth formers, have their own rooms.

The sixth form

Most pupils seeking entry to higher education take four subjects at AS Level in the Lower Sixth and then specialise in three of these to full A Level in the Upper Sixth.

Old Rishworthians

Academic

 Albert Hugh Smith – university professor

Stage, film, television

 John Noakes – Blue Peter presenter 
 Nicholas Connor –  Filmmaker
 Eric Portman – 20th century actor

Sport

George Ford – Sale Sharks and England Rugby Union
Joe Ford – Doncaster Knights Rugby Union coach
Gareth Widdop - Castleford Tigers and England Rugby League
Gerald Round - Wakefield Trinity and Great Britain Rugby League

External links
Independent Schools' Inspectorate
School website

Private schools in Calderdale
Educational institutions established in 1724
1724 establishments in England